The Constitutional Reform Act 2005 (c 4) is an Act of the Parliament of the United Kingdom, relevant to UK constitutional law. It provides for a Supreme Court of the United Kingdom to take over the previous appellate jurisdiction of the Law Lords as well as some powers of the Judicial Committee of the Privy Council, and removed the functions of Speaker of the House of Lords and Head of the Judiciary of England and Wales from the office of Lord Chancellor.

Background
The office of Lord Chancellor was reformed to remove the ability of the holder to act as both a government minister and a judge, an arrangement that ran contrary to the idea of separation of powers. The reform was motivated by concerns that the historical mixture of legislative, judicial, and executive power might not conform with the requirements of Article 6 (paragraph 1) of the European Convention on Human Rights, because a judicial officer who has legislative or executive power is likely not to be considered sufficiently impartial to provide a fair trial. This act ensures that the powers of the Lord Chancellor and the Secretary of State for Justice have limitations on their abilities over the president of the court.

Legislative history
The bill was originally introduced in the House of Lords on 24 February 2004 and proposed the following changes:
Abolition of the office of "Lord High Chancellor of Great Britain", generally known as the Lord Chancellor.
Setting up of a "Supreme Court of the United Kingdom" and moving the Law Lords out of the House of Lords to this new court.
Other measures relating to the judiciary, including changes to the position of the Lord Chief Justice and changes to the Judicial Committee of the Privy Council.

The bill caused much controversy and the Lords made amendments to it. The most significant of these was the decision not to abolish the position of Lord Chancellor, as, unlike other Secretaries of State in the UK Government, a number of the Lord Chancellor's functions are explicitly defined in law, and transferring these functions to other individuals would have required further legislation. However, although the post was retained, its role in relation to the judiciary is greatly reduced and the office holder is no longer automatically Speaker of the House of Lords because of the Government's announced intention to appoint Lord Chancellors from the House of Commons. Other measures remained generally the same as stated above.

The newly created Cabinet position of Secretary of State for Constitutional Affairs (originally created to wholly replace the Lord Chancellor's executive function) continued, although the holder of that Cabinet post—renamed Secretary of State for Justice in 2007—currently also holds the office of Lord Chancellor. The Lord Chancellor remains the custodian of the Great Seal (the bill as originally written put this into commission).

The bill was approved by both Houses on 21 March 2005, and received Royal Assent on 24 March.

Changes resulting from the act

The act contains provisions which reform two institutions and one former office of the United Kingdom. The document is divided into three parts: the first concerns the reform of the office of Lord Chancellor, the second creates and sets the framework for a Supreme Court, and the third regulates the appointment of judges.

Role of the Lord Chancellor 
Under the new legislation, the role of the Lord Chancellor was redefined. Rather than being the head of the Judiciary in England and Wales, the role of the Lord Chancellor was changed to managing the judiciary system including the Supreme Court, county courts, magistrates' courts and coroners' courts. In carrying out this duty, the Lord Chancellor is required to address both houses of Parliament and deliver a report as to how they have managed the Judiciary system.

The Lord Chief Justice replaces the Lord Chancellor as head of the English and Welsh judiciary. They are also responsible for representing the views of the judiciary to the Lord Chancellor and Parliament as a whole.

The law also set out an oath of office for the Lord Chancellor to take. the Oath: "I, (name), do swear that in the office of Lord High Chancellor of Great Britain I will respect the rule of law, defend the independence of the judiciary and discharge my duty to ensure the provision of resources for the efficient and effective support of the courts for which I am responsible. So help me God."

Supreme Court
The establishment of a Supreme Court is the main subject of the act and it had consequences for the House of Lords and the office of Lord Chancellor. The sections contained in Part 3 prescribe that the Supreme Court be composed of 12 judges (s. 23) and that the first judges be the then-current twelve Lords of Appeal in Ordinary (s. 24). The following sections (ss. 26–31) set out the rules for the appointment of future members of the Court. Section 11 of the Supreme Court Act 1981, amended by The Judicial Pensions and Retirement Act 1993, requires Justices of the Supreme Court to retire at age 70. Justices are appointed by the Monarch on the recommendation of the Prime Minister. On a death, or deselection approved by both houses, its selection commission consisting of the President and Deputy President of the Supreme Court (schedule 8) proposes one name to the Lord Chancellor who may reject a name only once per vacancy (since amended to Secretary of State for Justice), having a single veto. Sections 32 to 37 are entitled Terms of Appointment and deal with issues such as tenure, salaries and allowances, resignation and retirement, and pensions. Section 40 additionally sets out that the new Court will assume the jurisdiction of the House of Lords and the jurisdiction in matters of devolution of the Privy Council.

The following sections deal with practical matters such as procedures, staff, and resources of the new Court and the fees of the judges. The Chief Executive of the Supreme Court must prepare an annual report on the work and it must be presented to both Houses of Parliament (s. 51).

Although the Appellate Committee of the House of Lords is abolished, the 2005–06 serving Law Lords kept their judicial office in the new Supreme Court. Newly appointed members of the Court take no peerage, instead bearing the formal title Justice of the Supreme Court. Under the act such judges also have a courtesy title of Lord or Lady, for the expressed purpose of ensuring there is no perceived hierarchy among the JSCs.

The new Supreme Court sits in a separate building from the Houses of Parliament where the mentioned predecessor judicial committee (of the House of Lords) formerly acted as the UK's final court of appeal. After a lengthy survey of suitable sites, including Somerset House, Parliament and the former Lord Chancellor's Department agreed to the Court's installation in Middlesex Guildhall in Parliament Square, formerly a Crown Court building. Architect Lord Foster was chosen to design the necessary alterations. The building reopened as the Supreme Court on 1 October 2009.

Appointment of judges
The third part of the act is about the appointment of judges. In 1991 the Law Society had criticized the old system (the Monarch appointing judges on the advice of the Lord Chancellor), emphasizing its defects and recommending the establishment of an independent body responsible for appointing judges. The Constitutional Reform Act realized the hopes of the Law Society. Section 61 prescribed the creation of the Judicial Appointments Commission, responsible for the appointment of judges for English and Welsh courts. The following sections regulate the structure and the procedures of the Commission.

There are several criteria set out by the law in order for a person to become eligible to sit on the Supreme Court. These are:

 held high judicial office for a period of at least 2 years,
 been a qualifying practitioner for a period of at least 15 years,
 satisfied the judicial-appointment eligibility condition on a 15-year basis, or
 been a qualifying practitioner for a period of at least 15 years.

See also
Constitutional reform in the United Kingdom
Halsbury's Statutes
Reform of the House of Lords
UK constitutional law

References

External links
House of Commons Reports on Bills January 2005 Scroll halfway down the page for this bill's two reports.
Department for Constitutional Affairs The official website of the Department of Constitutional Affairs, which includes a section on constitutional reform in the UK
The election and role of the new Lord Speaker of the House of Lords

United Kingdom Acts of Parliament 2005
Government of the United Kingdom
Constitutional laws of the United Kingdom
Acts of the Parliament of the United Kingdom concerning the House of Lords
Courts of the United Kingdom
Courts of England and Wales
Judicial Committee of the Privy Council
Supreme Court of the United Kingdom
Reform in the United Kingdom